The 2021 New England Revolution II season is the second season in the soccer team's history, where they compete in the third division of American soccer, USL League One. New England Revolution II, as a child club of New England Revolution of Major League Soccer, are barred from participating in the 2021 U.S. Open Cup. New England Revolution II play their home games at Gillette Stadium, located in Foxborough, Massachusetts, United States.

Club

Roster 
As of July 22, 2021.

'#' Non-rostered academy player
+ On loan from first team
§ on loan to Forward Madison as of Aug 20, 2021

Coaching staff

Competitions

Exhibitions

USL League One

Standings

Results summary

Results by round

Match results

References

External links

New England Revolution II
New England Revolution II
New England Revolution II
New England Revolution II